Creature with the Atom Brain is a Belgian alternative rock band consisting of Millionaire keyboardist Aldo Struyf (Guitar/Keys/Vocals), Dave Schroyen (Drums), Jan Wygers (Bass) and Michiel Van Cleuvenbergen (Guitar). The band have been said to make "fuzzy stripped-back rock'n'roll noise with a generous helping of weird." The band's name is taken from the Roky Erickson & The Aliens song (Which in turn was taken from the 1955 film of the same name), with Struyf citing Erickson's former band The 13th Floor Elevators and the man himself as influencing Creature with the Atom Brain's sound.

After two 12" EPs on Conspiracy records, the band released their first full-length album on 24 March 2008, entitled I am the Golden Gate Bridge. The album notably featured guest vocals from fellow Millionaire band-member Tim Vanhamel and Mark Lanegan, Struyf having provided keyboards and toured for the latter's Bubblegum album. Creature with the Atom Brain have since toured in support of the album, including playing cancelled shows for Masters of Reality and supporting Jesus and Mary Chain on selected shows.

Discography

EPs
 The Snake (2005)
 Kill the Snake (2006)

Albums
 I Am The Golden Gate Bridge (2008)
 Transylvania (2009)
 The Birds Fly Low (2012)
 Night Of The Hunter (2015)

References

External links
 
 Creature with the Atom Brain at Last.fm
 Creature with the Atom Brain on MySpace
 Creature with the Atom Brain at Discogs

Belgian alternative rock groups